The 1935–36 Cornell Big Red men's ice hockey season was the 29th season of play for the program. The teams was coached by Nick Bawlf in his 14th season.

Season
Once again, the ice hockey team was forced to wait until some time in January before they could practice on Beebe Lake. The team got as much training in as they could and met Union for the first game of the season. The Big Red had to come back from a 3–1 deficit in the 3rd to tie the game and no overtime was played to determine the winner.

Cornell had to wait until after the semester break for the second match and they welcomed a familiar face to Ithaca in Colgate. The two played a closely-contested affair but, while Guthrie was sitting in the penalty box, the Red Raiders nabbed the winning goal. Howard "Curly" Dugan played the entire game on defense while brother Sam netted both Big Red goals. A week later the team hit the road and met stiff opposition in the form of Hamilton. The team played well but the offensive attack from the Continentals was just too much for them to handle.

The final game of the season was played against Syracuse after St. Lawrence cancelled its appearance. Several changes to the lineup resulted in Cornell earning its only win on the year. Simpson led the way with a hat-trick while the defense was manned aptly by the Dugan brothers.

Roster

Standings

Schedule and results

|-
!colspan=12 style=";" | Regular Season

References

Cornell Big Red men's ice hockey seasons
Cornell
Cornell
Cornell
Cornell